Transocean John Shaw was a semi-submersible drilling rig designed by Friede & Goldman as a self-propelled modified & enhanced pacesetter, built and delivered in 1982 by Mitsui Engineering & Shipbuilding Ltd. in Japan.

The Panama-convenience flagged vessel was designed and outfitted to operate in harsh environments.

The rig was named after John S. Shaw, former chairman of Birmingham, Alabama-based Sonat Inc. Sonat spun off its offshore division as Sonat Offshore in 1993, and it changed its name to Transocean in 1996. In January 2016, it was decided to scrap the rig, and after a period berthed at Invergordon, Scotland, it departed, under tow, for Aliaga, Turkey on 19 April 2016.

References

External links
 Transocean official website
 

Oil platforms
Semi-submersibles
Ships built by Mitsui Engineering and Shipbuilding
1982 ships
Drilling rigs
Transocean